Chalconoids Greek: χαλκός khalkós, "copper", due to its color), also known as chalcones, are natural phenols related to chalcone. They form the central core for a variety of important biological compounds.

They show antibacterial, antifungal, antitumor and anti-inflammatory properties. Some chalconoids demonstrated the ability to block voltage-dependent potassium channels. Chalcones are also natural aromatase inhibitors.

Chalcones are aromatic ketones with two phenyl rings that are also intermediates in the synthesis of many biological compounds. The closure of hydroxychalcones causes the formation of the flavonoid structure. Flavonoids are substances in the plant secondary metabolism with an array of biological activities.

Chalconoids are also intermediates in the Auwers synthesis of flavones.

Chemical properties

Biosynthesis and metabolism 
Chalcone synthase is an enzyme responsible for the production of chalconoids in plants.
Chalcone isomerase is responsible for their conversion into flavanones and other flavonoids.
Naringenin-chalcone synthase uses malonyl-CoA and 4-coumaroyl-CoA to produce CoA, naringenin chalcone, and CO2.
In aurones, the chalcone-like structure closes into a 5-atom ring instead of the more typical 6-atom ring (C ring).

Related compounds 
 Dihydrochalcones

References

External links